Erik Flensted Jensen (1908-1993) was the founder and leader of the Danish Gym Team. From 1939 till 1986 he toured the world showing Danish Elite Gymnastics to more than 2 million people in most countries around the globe. Everywhere he went with his teams he was ambassador not only for the gymnastics but also for Denmark and Danish culture. He has written four books that describe some of his travels with gymnastic teams. The books are all in the Danish language: "Med Niels Bukh Jorden Rundt" (1932), "40.000 km Under Dannebrog" (1945), "Med Dansk Ungdom I Amerikas Brogede Verden" (1952), "Mit Liv Og Mine Rejser" (1983).

1908 births
1993 deaths
Danish gymnasts